Early Recordings is a compilation album by the American indie band Quasi. It was released on March 29, 1996, on Key Op Records, and re-released on August 21, 2001 on Touch and Go Records.  It includes songs previously released on the band's self-titled, self-released cassette, as well as previously unreleased recordings.

Track listing
All tracks by Sam Coomes except where noted.

 "Two Hounds" – 2:41 
 "Superficial" – 3:27
 "Birds Are Bells" (Janet Weiss) – 1:56 
 "Lump of Coal" (Coomes, Weiss) – 3:08
 "Time Flies By" (Coomes, Weiss) – 2:26
 "Gaping Holes" – 3:08
 "Hui Neng" – 2:28
 "Homunculus" – 3:50
 "Monkey, Mirror" (Coomes, Weiss) – 3:52
 "Hairs" (Coomes, Weiss) – 1:04
 "The Egg" – 3:37
 "Rumpy" – 2:11
 "Digital Delay" (Weiss) – 2:09
 "Mammon" – 2:55
 "Reverse Coagulation" – 0:54 
 "Op. 7" (Coomes, Weiss) – 1:29
 "Pay Me Now, or Pay Me Later" – 3:45
 "Unspeakable Thing" (Weiss) – 4:07 
 "Deep Sleep" – 5:08

Personnel 

Sam Coomes – vocals, guitar, Roxichord, keyboards 
Janet Weiss – vocals, drums

Quasi albums
1996 compilation albums